

The Albatros L 75 Ass (German: "Ace") was a German trainer biplane of the 1920s. Of conventional configuration, it seated the pilot and instructor in separate, open cockpits. The wings were single-bay, equal-span, and had a slight stagger. Production continued after Albatros was absorbed by Focke-Wulf.

Variants
 L 75 - prototype with BMW IVa engine
 L 75a - production version with BMW Va engine
 L 75b - with Junkers L5 engine
 L 75c - BMW Va engine
 L 75d - BMW Va engine
 L 75E - BMW Va engine
 L 75F - Junkers L5G engine
 L 75DSA - BMW Va engine
 L 75DSB - Junkers L5 engine

Operators
 DVS

Specifications (L 75a)

References

Further reading
 

Biplanes
Single-engined tractor aircraft
1920s German civil trainer aircraft
L 075
Focke-Wulf aircraft